Vesper Cliff ( also known as Tioga Terrace, Glenbetsy, and Robert C. John House) an architecturally distinguished Greek Revival-style residence located immediately outside of the Town of Owego in Tioga County, New York. The primary dwelling is a building of "plank" construction to which was added about 1834, a monumental temple-fronted addition designed by architect Alexander Jackson Davis.  Also on the property is an unusual barn with a distinctive neoclassical facade treatment, as well as a chicken coop and ice house.

It was listed on the National Register of Historic Places in 2005.

References

Houses on the National Register of Historic Places in New York (state)
Houses completed in 1825
Houses in Tioga County, New York
Alexander Jackson Davis buildings
National Register of Historic Places in Tioga County, New York